Owen Frederick Butler (born 31 May 1944) was a rugby union player who represented Australia.

Butler, a lock, was born in Macksville, New South Wales and claimed a total of 7 international rugby caps for Australia.

References

Australian rugby union players
Australia international rugby union players
1944 births
Living people
Rugby union locks
Rugby union players from New South Wales